Mollaj is a village and a former municipality in the Korçë County, southeastern Albania. At the 2015 local government reformed it became a subdivision of the municipality Korçë. The population at the 2011 census was 3,438. The municipal unit consists of the villages Mollaj, Floq, Pulahë, Ujë Bardhë and Kamenicë.

References

Former municipalities in Korçë County
Administrative units of Korçë
Villages in Korçë County